The United States Virgin Islands competed at the 2011 World Aquatics Championships in Shanghai, China between July 16 and 31, 2011.

Swimming

U.S. Virgin Islands qualified 1 swimmer.

Men

References

Nations at the 2011 World Aquatics Championships
2011 in United States Virgin Islands sports
Virgin Islands at the World Aquatics Championships